Yvonne Vera (19 September 1964 – 7 April 2005) was an author from Zimbabwe. Her first published book was a collection of short stories, Why Don't You Carve Other Animals (1992), which was followed by five novels: Nehanda (1993), Without a Name (1994), Under the Tongue (1996), Butterfly Burning (1998), and The Stone Virgins (2002). Her novels are known for their poetic prose, difficult subject-matter, and their strong women characters, and are firmly rooted in Zimbabwe's difficult past. For these reasons, she has been widely studied and appreciated by those studying postcolonial African literature.

Life
Vera was born in Bulawayo, in what was then Southern Rhodesia, to Jerry Vera and Ericah Gwetai. At the age of eight, she worked as a cotton-picker near Hartley.
She attended Mzilikazi High School and then taught English literature at Njube High School, both in Bulawayo. In 1987, she immigrated to Canada and she married John Jose, a Canadian teacher whom she had met while he was teaching at Njube. At some point in the late 1980s, Vera was diagnosed as HIV-positive, but never shared this information during her lifetime. At York University, Toronto, she completed an undergraduate degree, a master's and a PhD, and taught literature.

In 1995, Vera separated from her husband and returned to Zimbabwe. In 1997 she became director of the National Gallery of Zimbabwe in Bulawayo, a gallery that showcases local talent ranging from that of professional artists to school children. She resigned in May 2003 because of the withdrawal of government funding, an exodus of local artists and a drop in visitors. In 2004, Vera returned to Canada with Jose to seek treatment. She died on 7 April 2005 of AIDS-related meningitis.

Awards
 1994: Commonwealth Writers' Prize (Africa) and Zimbabwe Publishers' Literary Award, for Without a Name
 2002: Macmillan Writers' Prize for Africa for The Stone Virgins
 2003: National Arts Merit Awards for Best Written Work.

Works
While at university, Vera submitted a story to a Toronto magazine: the publisher asked for more, so she sat down to write them. Her collection of short stories, Why Don't You Carve Other Animals, was published in 1992. It was followed by five completed novels:
Nehanda (Baobab Books, 1993), shortlisted for Commonwealth Writers' Prize
Without a Name (Baobab Books, 1994), awarded Commonwealth Writers' Prize for Africa and Zimbabwe Publishers' Literary Award
Under the Tongue (Baobab Books, 1996)
Butterfly Burning (1998), awarded a German literary prize, LiBeraturpreis, in 2002
The Stone Virgins (2002), awarded Macmillan Writers' Prize for Africa; extracted in New Daughters of Africa, edited by Margaret Busby, 2029

At the time of her death Vera was working on a new novel, Obedience, which has never been published. Her other works have been published in Zimbabwe, Canada and several other countries, including translations into Spanish, Italian and Swedish.

Vera wrote obsessively, often for 10 hours a day, and described time when she was not writing as "a period of fasting". Her work was passionate and lyrical. She took on themes such as rape, incest and infanticide, and gender inequality in Zimbabwe before and after the country's war of independence with sensitivity and courage. She said: "I would love to be remembered as a writer who had no fear for words and who had an intense love for her nation." In 2004 she was awarded the Swedish PEN Tucholsky Prize "for a corpus of works dealing with taboo subjects".

Vera also edited several anthologies by African women writers, including Opening Spaces: an Anthology of Contemporary African Women's Writing (Heinemann African Writers Series, 1999).

See also

 Nehanda Nyakasikana
 TSAR Publications

References

Robert Muponde and Mandivavarira Maodzwa-Taruvinga, eds, Sign and Taboo: Perspectives on the Poetic Fiction of Yvonne Vera (Harare: Weaver Press, 2002). Publisher's review
Yvonne Vera at postcolonial Literature in English.

External links

Yvonne Vera archives are held at the Clara Thomas Archives and Special Collections, York University Libraries, Toronto, Ontario
Interview with Financial Gazette, 2002
Jane Bryce, Interview with Yvonne Vera, Bulawayo, Zimbabwe, 1 August 2000. Published in Sign and Taboo (Harare: Weaver Press, 2002).

1964 births
2005 deaths
20th-century novelists
20th-century short story writers
20th-century Zimbabwean women writers
20th-century Zimbabwean writers
21st-century Zimbabwean women writers
21st-century Zimbabwean writers
AIDS-related deaths in Canada
Alumni of Mzilikazi High School
Deaths from meningitis
Neurological disease deaths in Ontario
People from Bulawayo
Women anthologists
Women novelists
York University alumni
Zimbabwean expatriates in Canada
Zimbabwean novelists
Zimbabwean short story writers
Zimbabwean women short story writers